Eliodoro Forbicini (born 1533), who flourished from 1550 to 1570, was a native of Verona, who excelled in grotesques. He decorated two rooms in the Palazzo Canova, which have been much admired.

References
 

1533 births
Year of death unknown
Painters from Verona